The 1969 Miami Dolphins season was the team's fourth season, and their final season in the American Football League (AFL). This was the final season for George Wilson as head coach, as Don Shula was hired next season and coached the team for the next 25 seasons until 1995. The team looked to improve on their 5–8–1 record from 1968. However, the Dolphins struggled from the season's start, losing their first 3 games before tying the Oakland Raiders and losing their next 2 games to start the season 0–5–1. After their week 7 win over the Buffalo Bills, the Dolphins would end the season with a 3–10–1 record. Their week 10 loss to the Buffalo Bills would be the last time the Dolphins lost to the Bills until 1980, as the Dolphins won 20 straight against Buffalo from 1970–1979. This became known as "The Streak", as it set an NFL record for the longest winning streak for one team against one opponent, which, as of 2023, is still an NFL record that has not been seriously threatened.

The Dolphins would not have another losing season until the 1976 Season.

Offseason

Common draft

Personnel

Staff

Roster

Regular season

Schedule

Standings

References

External links
 1969 Miami Dolphins at Pro-Football-Reference.com

Miami Dolphins
Miami Dolphins seasons
Miami Dolphins